Indra Lorentzen (born 17 August 1956 in Stockholm, Sweden) is a Norwegian dancer and choreographer with family roots on the mother's side, in Indonesia.

Biography 
Lorentzen started dancing at four years old in Stockholm. She studied dancing at the Opera Ballet School in Oslo, and became a member of the ballet ensemble of the Norwegian National Ballet in 1973, soloist in 1977. With her background as a half Indonesian, half Norwegian, she is in contact with a different culture of human relations also through body gestures.

She debuted as a choreographer for the Norwegian National Ballet in 1998 with the Sami-inspired Flettede stier, and has since choreographed several productions in Sweden, Norway and Greenland, including Peer Gynt and A Midsummer Night's Dream, and also dance films like Skårungen and the Radioballetten.

Lorentzen has danced an impressive list of roles in the Opera Ballet. It is like a list of highlights in recent Norwegian scene dance. She was awarded the Critics prize for the title role in Månerenen by Birgit Cullberg (1981), an immensely demanding role with hefty leap in savagery and pain. In Volven (1989) by Kjersti Alveberg, a piece created over Norse creation myths, she was elevated and strong, sometimes almost motionless, yet the center point that the show revolved about. The term dance theater got a new meaning in her representation of the mother in the family drama Tango (1987). She could visualize abstract sounds like in the figure 'Miranda' from The Tempest (1980). Moreover, she added the physical surplus that classical roles need in dance theatre. Her farewell performance in the Opera Ballet in 1997 was also Tango.

Lorentzen is a living example of the wisdom of an Indonesian statement: "A bad dancer showcases herself, the best dancer showcases dance". In this statement you find the wisdom that music, as the mystery of life, is all around us at all times. We don't create it, but we can borrow it from a universal source and make it visible. The music is in the Universe.

Honors 
Kritikerprisen (Norwegian Dance Critics Award) 1981, for the title role in Månerenen by Birgit Cullberg

References

External links 
Indra Lorentzen Biography at Store Norske Leksikon
Kjersti Alveberg, ASHES MIST, WINDBLOWN DUST, NRK 1986 on YouTube

1956 births
Norwegian female dancers
Living people
Norwegian choreographers